RAS-like, estrogen-regulated, growth inhibitor is a protein in humans that is encoded by the RERG gene.

RERG, a member of the RAS superfamily of GTPases, inhibits cell proliferation and tumor formation (Finlin et al., 2001 [PubMed 11533059]).[supplied by OMIM, Mar 2009].

References

External links 
 PDBe-KB provides an overview of all the structure information available in the PDB for Human Ras-related and estrogen-regulated growth inhibitor (RERG)

Further reading 

Human proteins